Simon Snow is the name of:

Simon Snow (writer), New Zealand writer
Simon Snow (MP) (1600–1667), English politician